Schizoporella is a genus of bryozoans in the family Schizoporellidae.

Species
Schizoporella aotearoa Gordon, 1989
Schizoporella artabra Reverter-Gil, Souto & Fernández-Pulpeiro, 2009
Schizoporella bifrons Moyano, 1965
Schizoporella bilamellata Liu & Hu, 1991
Schizoporella bispinosa (Nordgaard, 1906)
Schizoporella bolini (Osburn, 1952)
Schizoporella brunnescens Ortmann, 1890
Schizoporella chondra Marcus, 1921
Schizoporella cochinensis Menon & Nair, 1970
Schizoporella confusa Calvet, 1906
Schizoporella cornualis Hayward & Ryland, 1995
Schizoporella costata Kluge, 1962
Schizoporella crassirostris (Hincks, 1883)
Schizoporella crassomuralis Canu & Bassler, 1927
Schizoporella crustacea (Smitt, 1868)
Schizoporella cucullata (Canu & Bassler, 1929)
Schizoporella decorata Canu & Bassler, 1927
Schizoporella dunkeri (Reuss, 1848)
Schizoporella elliptica (Canu & Bassler, 1930)
Schizoporella elmwoodiae Waters, 1900
Schizoporella erectorostris (Canu & Bassler, 1930)
Schizoporella errata (Waters, 1878)
Schizoporella erratoidea Liu, 2001
Schizoporella fallax Canu & Bassler, 1928
Schizoporella fayalensis Calvet, 1903
Schizoporella fistulata O'Donoghue & O'Donoghue, 1923
Schizoporella flexilis Canu & Bassler, 1927
Schizoporella floridana Osburn, 1914
Schizoporella gibsonensis Tilbrook, 2006
Schizoporella grandicella (Canu & Bassler, 1930)
Schizoporella granulata O'Donoghue & O'Donoghue, 1923
Schizoporella hesperia Hayward & Ryland, 1995
Schizoporella hexagona Nordgaard, 1905
Schizoporella inarmata Hincks, 1884
Schizoporella incerta Kluge, 1929
Schizoporella inconspicua Hincks, 1891
Schizoporella japonica Ortmann, 1890
Schizoporella kiiensis (Okada & Mawatari, 1938)
Schizoporella leperei (Audouin in Savigny, 1826)
Schizoporella limbata Lorenz, 1886
Schizoporella longirostris Hincks, 1886
Schizoporella magnifica (Hincks, 1886)
Schizoporella magniporata Nordgaard, 1906
Schizoporella maulina Moyano, 1983
Schizoporella mutabilis Calvet, 1927
Schizoporella neptuni (Jullien, 1882)
Schizoporella obesa (Waters, 1900)
Schizoporella obsoleta Jullien, 1882
Schizoporella occidentalae Soule & Soule, 1964
Schizoporella pachystega Kluge, 1929
Schizoporella patula Hayward & Ryland, 1995
Schizoporella perforata Canu & Bassler, 1929
Schizoporella proditor Canu & Bassler, 1929
Schizoporella pseudoerrata Soule, Soule & Chaney, 1995
Schizoporella pungens Canu & Bassler, 1928
Schizoporella smitti Kluge, 1962
Schizoporella spinosa Souto, Reverter-Gil & Fernández-Pulpeiro, 2010
Schizoporella stelloperforata Kluge, 1961
Schizoporella stylifera (Levinsen, 1886)
Schizoporella tetragona (Reuss, 1848)
Schizoporella thompsoni Kluge, 1962
Schizoporella triaviculata Calvet, 1903
Schizoporella trimorpha Canu & Bassler, 1928
Schizoporella umbonata O'Donoghue & O'Donoghue, 1926
Schizoporella unicornis (Johnston in Wood, 1844)

References

Bryozoan genera
Cheilostomatida